Elaine MacKenzie is the second album by Chicago pop band Green, released in 1987 on Pravda Records.

Reception
In writing for Spin, Ira Robbins called Elaine MacKenzie "an album of great accomplishment" that "pair[s] the most worthwhile Kinks influence since Big Star with enough hoarse soulful R&B soul for a Small Faces LP on Paisley Park." He gave further praise to Jeff Lescher's vocal performance, which he described as "a rough but melodic roar that seems to be straining for release." The Chicago Tribune called the album "a minor masterpiece." Perfect Sound Forever wrote that the album "was nearly as accomplished as its predecessor, ramping up the ambition, and letting the frenzy fly." The Chicago Reader called the album "brilliant," writing that it featured the band's "perhaps most crucial lineup."

Track listing

Personnel
Green
Ken Kurson – bass guitar, vocals
Jeff Lescher – guitar, vocals
Richard Clifton – drums
Additional musicians and production
Philippe Christian Bonnet – recording
Green – production
Johnny Hell – recording

References

External links 
 

1987 albums
Green (band) albums